Graham Pushee (born 1954) is an Australian countertenor. Together with the Australian Brandenburg Orchestra, conducted by Paul Dyer, Pushee was nominated for the 1995 ARIA Award for Best Classical Album for the album Handel: Arias.

Discography

Albums

Awards and nominations

ARIA Awards
The ARIA Music Awards are presented annually since 1987 by the Australian Recording Industry Association (ARIA).

|-
| 1995 || Handel: Opera Arias || ARIA Award for Best Classical Album || 
|}

Mo Awards
The Australian Entertainment Mo Awards (commonly known informally as the Mo Awards), were annual Australian entertainment industry awards. They recognise achievements in live entertainment in Australia from 1975 to 2016.
 (wins only)
|-
| 1995
| Graham Pushee
| Operatic Performance of the Year
| 
|-

References

External links
 Profile, artsmanagement.com.au
 Profile, bach-cantatas.com

1954 births
Living people
Operatic countertenors
20th-century Australian male opera singers
21st-century Australian male opera singers